Parklife is an annual two-day music festival in Manchester, England and takes place in June each year. The festival predominantly features dance and electronic music, as well as pop and hip-hop artists.

Jointly organised by a number of groups, including Manchester's The Warehouse Project and Live Nation, the festival started life as Mad Ferret Festival in Platt Fields Park, Rusholme, before moving to Heaton Park in north Manchester in 2013 in order to accommodate the increased numbers attending. By 2023 the non-camping festival has a capacity of 82,500 people over the two days.

Line-ups

2010s

2020 
The would-be 2020 event was to feature headline artist Tyler, The Creator, the performance being one of his first since being banned in the UK by former Home Secretary Theresa May over alleged "violence and intolerance of homosexuality".

Khalid, Lewis Capaldi, Charli XCX, Little Simz, Carl Cox, Bicep and Eric Prydz were also set perform at the event, among others. However, in March 2020, the festival was cancelled due to the ongoing COVID-19 pandemic.

2021
The festival was pushed back to a later date of 11 and 12 September 2021 because of the Covid-19 pandemic. Artists announced included Dave as a UK festival exclusive, alongside Megan Thee Stallion, Skepta, Dababy (later dropped after a spate of homophobic comments), Disclosure, Mabel, Becky Hill, Carl Cox, Peggy Gou, Young Thug (who was later replaced by Migos because of scheduling conflicts), Jamie XX, Burna Boy and Bicep.

2022
On 25 January 2022, the festival announced that it would be returning to Heaton Park on 11 and 12 June 2022.

Acts including 50 Cent (UK festival exclusive), Tyler, The Creator, Megan Thee Stallion, Loyle Carner, Chase & Status, Central Cee, PinkPantheress, Camelphat, Patrick Topping, Jamie XX, Annie Mac and Fred Again.

2023 
On 31 January 2023, the festival announced that years lineup, featuring The 1975, Aitch (UK Festival Headline Exclusive), The Prodigy, Wu-Tang Clan, Rudimental, Michael Bibi b2b Jamie Jones (Global Exclusive), Charlotte De Witte, Patrick Topping, FISHER, Nx Worries (Anderson Paak and Knxwledge) as well as The Blessed Madonna, Becky Hill, Ben Hemsley, RAYE and Skrillex.

Awards and nominations

DJ Magazine's top 50 Festivals

See also
 The Warehouse Project
 List of electronic music festivals
 List of music festivals in the United Kingdom

References

Music festivals in Greater Manchester
Counterculture festivals
Music festivals in Hampshire
Electronic music festivals in the United Kingdom
Rave culture in the United Kingdom